5-Histidylcysteine sulfoxide synthase is the first enzyme in the biosynthesis of ovothiol, catalyzing the oxidative addition of cysteine to histidine, forming 5-histidylcysteine sulfoxide. The enzyme is found in Trypanosomes, where it additionally has a SAM dependent methyl transferase, which adds a methyl group to N1.

References

Enzymes